Gianfranco Randone (born 5 January 1970), known by his stage name Jeffrey Jey, is an Italian musician and singer-songwriter, best known as the lead vocalist of the group Eiffel 65 (1997–2005, 2010–present). He was also the lead singer of the groups Bliss Team (1992–1997) and Bloom 06 (2005–2010). After Eiffel 65's reunion in June 2010, he toured Italy and Europe with the band. In addition to singing, Jey also plays bass guitar, electric guitar, drums and keyboards.

Jey lived in Brooklyn, New York from 1980 to 1985. It was during this time he became interested in becoming a musician due to all the influences throughout the city. He is fluent in both English and Italian.

Discography

Singles
 "Out of Your Arms" (2012)
 "The Color Inside Her" (2013)
 "Adesso per sempre" (2017)
 "Sabbia" (2017)
 "Lega" (2018)
 "Settembre" (2018)
 "FOTO" (2020)

References

External links
 Official Twitter Page
 Official Facebook Page

1970 births
Living people
People from Lentini
Italian male singers
Eurodance musicians
English-language singers from Italy
Italian bass guitarists
Male bass guitarists
21st-century bass guitarists
Eiffel 65 members